Mary di Michele (born 6 August 1949) is an Italian-Canadian poet and author. She is a professor at Concordia University in Montreal, Quebec where she teaches in creative writing.

Early life and education
di Michele was born in Lanciano, Italy. She immigrated to Toronto, Ontario with her family in 1955. She obtained an Honours B.A. in English Literature at the University of Toronto in 1972. Later, she completed an M.A. in English and creative writing at the University of Windsor in 1974.

Career
di Michele published her first book of poetry, Tree of August, in 1978. She traveled to Chile in 1987 as part of a literary cultural exchange. In 1990, she became a professor of English at Concordia University.

By 1995 di Michele had written six volumes of poetry. That year she published her first novel, Under My Skin. She continued to write and publish poetry, and in 2005 released a second novel, Tenor of Love.

In 2017 di Michele published a book of poetry, Bicycle Thieves.

In 2018 her works are held in more than 1400 libraries.

Works
Tree of August – 1978
Bread and Chocolate – 1980
Mimosa and Other Poems – 1981
Necessary Sugar – 1984
Anything is Possible: A Selection of Eleven Women Poets (editor) – 1984
Immune to Gravity – 1986
Under My Skin (novel) – 1994
Luminous Emergencies – 1990
Stranger in You: Selected Poems and New – 1995
Debriefing the Rose – 1998
Tenor of Love (novel) – 2005

See also
List of Canadian writers
List of Canadian poets

References

External links
Mary di Michele's web page
Institute of Advanced Studies (Univ. of Bologna) poet in residence, 2003
Athabasca University's Canadian Writers page

1949 births
20th-century Canadian novelists
20th-century Canadian poets
21st-century Canadian novelists
21st-century Canadian poets
Canadian women novelists
Canadian women poets
Italian emigrants to Canada
Living people
20th-century Canadian women writers
21st-century Canadian women writers